Greenfield Community College (GCC) is a public, two-year community college in Greenfield, Massachusetts. It was founded in 1962 and is one of Massachusetts's 15 community colleges. The main campus, which comprises two buildings, is located in Greenfield, Massachusetts on a 107-acre property near the junction of Interstate 91 and Route 2. The school also owns a building in downtown Greenfield and a satellite campus at Smith Vocational and Agricultural High School in Northampton, Massachusetts. GCC students hail from Hampshire, Franklin, and Worcester Counties in Western Massachusetts, as well as southern Vermont and New Hampshire. Many of GCC's transfer students continue on at one of Hampshire County's Five Colleges, or to one of 14 Massachusetts State Universities. GCC is the largest source of transfer students to Smith College. In fiscal year 2018, GCC had a student head count FTE (full-time equivalent) of 1,086, making it the second-smallest community college in the state of Massachusetts. On May 30, 2019, Dr. Yves Salomon-Fernandez, who had served as president since fall 2018, was officially inaugurated as the 10th president of Greenfield Community College. Greenfield Community College is accredited by the New England Commission of Higher Education.

References

External links
Official website

Community colleges in Massachusetts
Educational institutions established in 1962
Universities and colleges in Franklin County, Massachusetts
Greenfield, Massachusetts
1962 establishments in Massachusetts